Shahid Babaei High School (Persian: مرکز آموزشی شهید بابایی) is Qazvin Branch of National Organization for Development of Exceptional Talents . It was named after Iranian pilot, Abbas Babaei. It is also known as QAZVIN SAMPAD (Persian: سمپاد قزوین). This branch of NODET, which is located in north of Qazvin] has intermediate and High School in the same building.

Admission to school
Admission to Nodet schools is selective and based on a comprehensive nationwide entrance examination procedure. Every year hundreds of qazvinian students apply to enter these schools, from which less than 5% are chosen for the middle and high school of Shahid Babaei Training complex. NODET has 99 middle schools and 98 high schools within the country. The process of the entrance to these schools includes two tests devised to measure the intelligence and talent of the participants rather than their acquired knowledge. Once students are considered competitive, they are allowed to take the first test, the result of which determines if they are allowed to take the second test. The source of questions is not pre-announced.
 
The style of the questions in the entrance exam varies from one exam (or one section of the exam) to another, but rather unusual types of questions are included in the exams each year. There are some questions that describe a certain phenomenon and a problem surrounding it, asking the student to choose from one of the four possible answers, but also describe the reason of their choice. And the evaluation of the answer wouldn't be based on the choice, but on the described reason, trying to distinguish students with higher reasoning abilities. To mention another uncommon type of question, starting with a brief introduction on a certain scientific concept that most students don't have any knowledge about, the student is given a problem with enough description to make the student be able to solve the problem through mental mathematical calculations, scientific reasoning or even their instinct, making it possible for students with different types of problem-solving skills to be selected. All applicants must have a minimum GPA of 19 (out of 20) for attending the entrance exam.
Statistics show that NODET alumni usually pursue higher education until the post-graduate level. Some NODET alumni are world-class-leading researchers in Science, Engineering, and Medicine.

NODET Structure
The manager of the organization was Hojjatoleslam Javad Ezhei who managed this organization from 1988 to 2009. The new manager is Dr. Etemadi. The schools for girls are named Farzanegan School and the boys' schools have different names in different cities.

Shahid Babaei high school
This school includes intermediate and high school and was founded in 1989. The whole number of students is 411 (according to NODET website).  Since the beginning of the establishment the school has three managers. The first manager was Seyyed Jalal Hosseini that started his work on September 11, 1989. The second one was Mohammad Ebrahim Faezi who started August 20, 1995; the period of his management was the longest in history of school, about 12 years. The last manager was [Seyyed Mohammad Ghafelebashi who has started his work on September 10, 2007.

The Campus and facilities
The campus is located in the famous Daneshgah neighborhood of Qazvin. The school has two buildings: one, the main building, includes the classrooms, lecture theater, library, physics laboratory, chemistry and biology laboratories, computer lab, professional and technical workshop, a fully equipped robotics workshop and a small food court. The second building is a sport room. The campus also has a soccer artificial grass field, a badminton court, a volleyball court and a basketball court.

Education
The Iranian high school system offers three important majors to all students: math-physics, natural sciences, and humanities. Shahid Babaei High School propose all there majors, Math-Physics, Natural Sciences and Humanities . The main concern for most high school students in Iran is the Konkour (National university entrance examination). Shahid Babaei High School hires well-experienced teachers. Hence, the students are very well prepared. They generally perform well in the Konkour.

Several students from Shahid Babaei high school have been awarded medals in Scientific Contests at National levels. Also they have been successful in Mathematics, Computer Science, Physics, Astronomy and Chemistry Olympiads at both national and international levels and they have won several medals.

References

External links 
 Shahid Babaei Website 
 NODET Website
 NODET Students Linkedin group

High schools in Iran
Boys' schools in Iran
Education in Qazvin Province